Koo Kyo-hwan (born 14 December 1982) is a South Korean actor and film director known for his role in the films Jane (2016), Peninsula (2020), and Escape from Mogadishu (2021). He also attracted recognition for his performance in Netflix original D.P. (2021).

Filmography

As actor

Film

Television series

Web series

As director 
 Turtles (short film, 2011) – director
 Where is My DVD? (short film, 2013) – director
 Welcome to My Home (short film, 2013) – director
 Love Docu (short film, 2014) – director
 After School (short film, 2015) – director 
 Fly to the Sky (short film, 2015) – director 
 Now Playing (2015) – also credited as screenwriter, producer, film editor, script editor
 Girls on Top (short film, 2017) – director

As screenwriter 
 Maggie (2018) - also credited as film editor

Awards and nominations

References

External links 
 
 
 

1982 births
Living people
South Korean male television actors
South Korean male film actors
South Korean film directors
South Korean male web series actors
South Korean screenwriters
Seoul Institute of the Arts alumni
Best New Actor Paeksang Arts Award (film) winners
Best New Actor Paeksang Arts Award (television) winners